The 1957 Little All-America college football team is composed of college football players from small colleges and universities who were selected by the Associated Press (AP) as the best players at each position. For 1957, the AP selected three teams of 11 players each, with no separate defensive platoons.

The AP reiterated in 1957 the purpose of the Little All-America team to honor players "who competed for smaller colleges outside the glare of the headlines."

Norm Jarock of St. Norbert's led all small college players in total offense with 1,306 rushing yards and 252 passing yards.

Leonard Lyles of Louisville was the leading scorer in college football with 132 points.

Dan Nolan of Lehigh tallied 856 passing yards and 248 rushing yards in a nine-game schedule.

First team
 Back - Dan Nolan (senior, 6'2", 185 pounds), Lehigh
 Back - Charles Bradshaw (senior, 5'11", 170 pounds), 
 Back - Leonard Lyles (senior, 6'2", 198 pounds), Louisville
 Back - Norman Jarock (senior, 6'0", 191 pounds), St. Norbert’s
 End - Howard Clark (senior, 6'1", 200 pounds), Chattanooga
 End - Peter Kasson (junior, 5'11", 165 pounds), Ripon
 Tackle - Bruce Hartman (senior, 6'0", 245 pounds), Luther
 Tackle - Dudley Meredith (senior, 6'4", 235 pounds), Lamar Tech
 Guard - Howard Morris (senior, 5'10", 190 pounds), Linfield
 Guard - Dave Young (senior, 5'10", 180 pounds), Randolph Macon
 Center - Dick Huston (senior, 5'11", 200 pounds), Eastern Washington

Second team
 Back - Tony Toto, Delaware
 Back - Dick Camp, Wheaton
 Back - Les Plumb, Springfield
 Back - George Sullivan, Whitman
 End - Tom Taylor, Albion
 End - Jerry Hurst, Middle Tennessee
 Tackle - Dave Triplett, Hillsdale
 Tackle - George Kurker, Tufts
 Guard - Charles Davis, McMurry State
 Guard - James Hardin, Bowling Green
 Center - Jerry Jurizik, St. Benedict's

Third team
 Back - Terry Stevens, Upper Iowa
 Back - Dale Thibault, Westminster (Utah)
 Back - James Hirth, Abilene Christian
 Back - Frank Capitani, Gettysburg
 End - Jerry Richardson, Wofford
 End - Clint Westemeyer, St. Ambrose
 Tackle - Pete Williams, Lehigh
 Tackle - Floyd Peters, San Francisco State
 Guard - Lou Mooradian, Connecticut
 Guard - Frank Farella, Arkansas State
 Center - Al Vadnais, Hofstra

See also
 1957 College Football All-America Team

References

Little All-America college football team
Little All-America college football team
Little All-America college football teams